Autoimmune polyendocrine syndrome type 2, a form of autoimmune polyendocrine syndrome also known as  APS-II, or PAS II, is the most common form of the polyglandular failure syndromes. PAS II is defined as the association between autoimmune Addison's disease and either autoimmune thyroid disease, type 1 diabetes, or both. It is heterogeneous and has not been linked to one gene. Rather, individuals are at a higher risk when they carry a particular human leukocyte antigen (HLA-DQ2, HLA-DQ8 and HLA-DR4). APS-II affects women to a greater degree than men.

Signs and symptoms
Signs and symptoms that are consistent in an individual affected with autoimmune polyendocrine syndrome type 2 are the following:

 Nausea
  Frequent urination
  Palpitations
  Weight loss
 Anorexia
  Low blood pressure
  Hypoparathyroidism
  Myalgias
 Hashimoto thyroiditis
 Graves' disease
 Anaemia
 Hypogonadism
 Diabetes mellitus

Genetics

In terms of genetics one finds that autoimmune polyendocrine syndrome type 2 has an autosomal dominant pattern of inheritance, with an incomplete penetrance. Furthermore, the human leukocyte antigen  involved in this condition are HLA-DQ2(DR3 (DQB*0201)) and HLA-DQ8(DR4 (DQB1*0302)), genetically speaking, which indicates this is a multifactorial disorder, as well.

Should any affected organs show chronic inflammatory infiltrate (lymphocytes), this would be an indication. Moreover,
autoantibodies reacting to specific antigens is common, in the immune system of an affected individual.

Diagnosis
In terms of genetic testing, while it is done for type 1 of this condition, type 2 will only render (or identify) those genes which place the individual at higher risk. Other methods/exam to ascertain if an individual has autoimmune polyendocrine syndrome type 2 are:
 CT scan
 MRI
 Ultrasound

Treatment

Management of autoimmune polyendocrine syndrome type 2 consists of the following:
 Cyclosporin A
 Isohormonal therapy
 Glucocorticoids
 Thyroid-stimulating hormone
 Dietary guidelines(depending if diabetic/Addison d.)

History
The condition was recognized by Martin Benno Schmidt (1863 – 1949), a German pathologist, first described in 1926. A third subtype, PAS III, has  been described in adults, but apart from the absence of adrenal failure, no clinical differences between types II and III have been described. Because of this, both of these subtypes are generally referred to as PAS II.

See also
 IPEX syndrome
 Autoimmune polyendocrine syndrome

Notable Cases 

 U.S. President John F. Kennedy is presumed to have suffered from Autoimmune Polyendocrine Syndrome, Type II.

References

Further reading

External links 
 PubMed

Endocrine diseases
Autoimmune diseases
Syndromes